Do the Twist! is a studio album recorded in late 1961/early 1962 by U. S. Entertainer Connie Francis. It was released in early 1962 on MGM Records. Later that same year it was repackackaged and re-released under a new title, Dance Party.

The album
When the Twist became the biggest dance phenomenon of 1961, many artists recorded Twist-themed singles and albums, usually as a quickly produced rush releases as the audience's tastes in current dances changed very fast. Some of the follow-up dances to the Twist were the Mashed Potato or the Pony.

For her own Twist album, Francis recorded a total of seventeen songs, most of them written by Eddie Curtis who had also written Francis' 1959 recording You're Gonna Miss Me. Most of his works for this album were new songs, the exception being Mommy, You're Daughter's Fallin' in Love, which used the tune of Winfield Scott's Tweedlee Dee. Here, Curtis only provided new lyrics.

The sessions were arranged and conducted by Sammy Lowe and held on November 20, 1961 and on January 4, 8 and 9, 1962 in New York City.

The album was originally released in January 1962 shortly after the last recording session under the title Do The Twist!. It was released in both mono and stereo, both editions containing the song Does ol' Broadway ever sleep in versions with differently mixed street noises at the intro. It was shipped to record stores in a simple black cover with the title written on it in large neon green colored letters, very similar to Ray Charles' Do The Twist! album from 1961. The UK version of the album sported the letters in neon red.

In July 1962, the album was repackaged with a new cover design and was re-released under the new title Dance Party.

Single releases, foreign language versions and unreleased songs
The album's opening track, Mr. Twister (not to be confused with the Chubby Checker song of the same name), was released in several territories outside the U. S. as a 45 rpm single. Francis herself recorded the song also in Italian, French, Japanese and Spanish. It is also one of only two songs Francis ever recorded in Swedish.

Kiss 'n' Twist (Kissin' Twist), with a tune based on the traditional Italian dance Tarantella and lyrics provided by Mike Canosa and Danny Stradella, was also released as a 45 rpm single in several territories. Additionally, Francis recorded a German rendering under the title Ein Boy für mich.

Drop It, Joe was released as the flipside to Francis' single Don't Break the Heart That Loves You in January 1962.

Telephone Lover was released in Greece as the flipside to Mr. Twister.

Don't Cry On My Shoulder was not released in the United States at all during the 1960s but was a single B-side in several European countries. A German recording under the title Alle meine Tränen was scheduled to be recorded at Austrophon Studios in Vienna on April 13, 1962 during the same session as Ein Boy für mich but this was abandoned due to delays in the busy recording schedule.

Gonna Git That Man was released in April 1962 as the flipside to Francis' single Second Hand Love (MGM Records K 13074, # 9) and later on the compilation Album Connie Francis sings "Second Hand Love" (MGM Records E-/SE-4049) 

The remaining songs Love Bird, Cha Cha Twist, Lovey Dovey Twist (loosely based on Eddie Curtis's 1954 composition Lovey Dovey) and an alternate version of Mr. Twister wouldn't be released until 1996.

Tracks

Album - Side A

Album - Side B

Not included songs from the sessions

Foreign-language versions

References

Connie Francis albums
1962 albums
Albums produced by Danny Davis (country musician)
MGM Records albums